Vilém Prusinovský z Víckova (in German: William Prusinowsky von Wiczkov) (1534 – June 16, 1572)  was a bishop of Olomouc in 1565–1572. He started his office in the times of Catholic-Protestant controversy and lead  the policy of Council of Trent. He forced the Utraquists to accept his authority. He invited Jesuits to Olomouc and a year after his death, in 1573, his plan of promotion of the Olomouc school to Jesuit Academy was realized and the second oldest university in the Czech lands was established. It is possible he was poisoned from Philopon.

References

External links 

1534 births
1572 deaths
Bishops of Olomouc
16th-century Roman Catholic bishops in the Holy Roman Empire
Victims of serial killers